Beartooth Mountain is in the Beartooth Mountains in the U.S. state of Montana. The peak is one of the tallest in the Beartooth Mountains, the 11th tallest in Montana (tied with Bowback Mountain) and is in the Absaroka-Beartooth Wilderness in Custer National Forest. Along a ridge  to the northeast lies the spire known as Bears Tooth.

References

Beartooth
Beartooth Mountains
Beartooth